Posht Tang-e Dustali (also Romanized as Posht Tang-e Dūst‘alī and Posht-e Tang-e Dūst ‘Alī) is a village in Itivand-e Shomali Rural District, Kakavand District, Delfan County, Lorestan Province, Iran. At the 2006 census, its population was 107, in 22 families.

References 

Towns and villages in Delfan County